Yoshitomo Tani (谷 佳知, born February 9, 1973) is a former Japanese professional baseball player from Higashiōsaka, Osaka, Japan. He played as an outfielder for the Orix Buffaloes and Yomiuri Giants. He holds the Pacific League record for hits in a single season by a right-handed batter with 189 hits in 2003 for Orix. He also holds the Japanese NPB record for doubles in a single season with 52 in 2001.

Tani emerged as a recurrent Best Nine award winner in the late 90s and early 2000s for Orix, and played a large role in carrying the Blue Wave/Buffaloes following Ichiro Suzuki's departure to play with the Seattle Mariners in MLB

Biography
Tani is married to Ryoko Tani, a famous judoka who has won two gold medals, two silver medals and the bronze in Judo at the Summer Olympics.

He was selected for the Japanese baseball team at the 2004 Summer Olympics, and won a bronze medal. He also won a silver medal at the 1996 Summer Olympics before entering the Japanese professional leagues.

Career Awards
Most league steals 2002 (43)
Most league hits 2003 (189)

External links

NPB.com

1973 births
Living people
People from Higashiōsaka
Nippon Professional Baseball outfielders
Baseball players at the 1996 Summer Olympics
Baseball players at the 2004 Summer Olympics
Olympic baseball players of Japan
Olympic silver medalists for Japan
Olympic bronze medalists for Japan
Orix BlueWave players
Orix Buffaloes players
Yomiuri Giants players
Olympic medalists in baseball
Medalists at the 2004 Summer Olympics
Medalists at the 1996 Summer Olympics